Anding may refer to:

Places

China

Districts and counties 
 Anding District, Dingxi, Gansu, formerly Anding County
 Zichang County, formerly Anding County

Towns 
 Anding, Beijing, in Daxing District, Beijing
 , subdivision of Pingjiang County, Hunan
 , subdivision of Taonan, Jilin
 , subdivision of Zichang County, Shaanxi
 , subdivision of Jingdong Yi Autonomous County, Yunnan

Historical 
 Anding Commandery, commandery in Gansu and Ningxia

Taiwan 
 Anding District, Tainan

Elsewhere 
 Anding, Mississippi, an unincorporated community in Yazoo County, Mississippi, US

People with the surname 
 Carola Anding (born 1960), former East German cross country skier
 Charles Anding (1928–2004), American labor leader and politician
 Don Anding (born 1991), American soccer player
 Princess Anding, also known as Princess Taihe, princess of the Chinese dynasty Tang Dynasty

Other uses 
 Logical conjunction, or and, two-place logical operation used in logic and mathematics
 Typhoon Anding (disambiguation), several typhoons